New York State Route 100 (NY 100) is a major north–south state highway in Westchester County, New York, in the United States. It begins parallel to Interstate 87 (I-87) at a junction with the Cross County Parkway in the city of Yonkers and runs through most of the length of the county up to U.S. Route 202 (US 202) in the town of Somers. NY 100 was designated as part of the 1930 renumbering of state highways in New York. Prior to becoming a state road, various sections of NY 100 were part of several important early roads in the county.

Route description

NY 100 begins in the city of  Yonkers as Central Park Avenue (almost always just called "Central Avenue") at exit 4 of the New York State Thruway (I-87). This portion of Central Avenue is maintained by Westchester County as County Route 47II (CR 47II), an unsigned reference route. Central Avenue continues south as a service road for I-87 until The Bronx, where it splits from I-87 shortly after entering the city, and becomes Jerome Avenue, a major surface road in the West Bronx. NY 100 diverges from I-87 just north of exit 5 and heads northeast, crossing over the Sprain Brook Parkway about  beyond the split. Central Avenue has an interchange with Tuckahoe Road shortly after the Sprain Brook Parkway. The road continues through Yonkers in the area between the Grassy Sprain Reservoir and the Bronx River, with many shops lining both sides. At the northernmost part of the city, Central Avenue intersects Fort Hill Road, which leads to Jackson Avenue and the northbound Sprain Brook Parkway. Central Avenue continues out of the city of Yonkers into the Edgemont/Greenville section of the town of Greenburgh. The only noteworthy intersection in this area is with Ardsley Road, and east-west road that goes straight across most of south-central Westchester. NY 100 runs through the hamlet of Hartsdale, about two miles (3 km) north of the city line, and where the bypass route NY 100A (Hartsdale Avenue) begins. Hartsdale Avenue also continues east of the intersection into the village of Hartsdale without a route designation. Central Avenue then enters the city limits of White Plains, where the road ends at NY 119 (Tarrytown Road). Within White Plains, the road is county-maintained with unsigned designations of CR 99 and CR 90.

NY 100 north follows NY 119 west for a  overlap through the western reaches of White Plains. Access to I-287 (the Cross-Westchester Expressway) and the Bronx River Parkway can be made in the vicinity of the 100/119 overlap. NY 100 then splits off to the north using Hillside Avenue and Grasslands Road as it goes around the perimeter of Westchester Community College. At a four-way intersection between Grasslands Road, Knollwood Road, and Bradhurst Avenue, NY 100 meets with the north end of NY 100A (Knollwood Road) and the east end of NY 100C. NY 100 makes a right-hand turn to follow Bradhurst Avenue north from the junction while Grasslands Road continues west as NY 100C. Bradhurst Avenue leads into the hamlet of Hawthorne within the town of Mount Pleasant, crossing over the Sprain Brook Parkway along the way. NY 100 subsequently shifts onto Briarcliff-Peekskill Parkway (NY 9A), a continuation of the Saw Mill River Road, after using a brief section of NY 141 (Broadway). From this junction, the parkway (carrying 9A and 100) is a limited access highway (or "freeway") as it continues north alongside the Taconic State Parkway.

NY 100 then branches off on its own again in Briarcliff Manor, with NY 9A continuing north along the Briarcliff–Peekskill Parkway and NY 100 continuing northeast on the Saw Mill River Road, which roughly follows New York Central's old Putnam Division railroad.  Many of the railroad's old stations can still be found along the highway. NY 100 passes through New Castle and meets NY 133 in the hamlet of Millwood, where access to the Taconic State Parkway can also be made. From here, NY 100 then follows the path of the Croton Turnpike (alternatively known in the area as Somerstown Turnpike and also as Saw Mill River Road). The road continues into the town of Yorktown, passing by the hamlet of Kitchawan. NY 100 then crosses the Croton Reservoir on Pines Bridge. After crossing the reservoir, NY 118 splits off to the west on Saw Mill River Road, while NY 100 continues northeast on the Croton Turnpike.

The Croton Turnpike continues into the town of Somers, passing by some of the last remaining rural areas in Westchester County, including Muscoot Farm, a county owned early-1900s interpretive farm. North of the farm NY 100 intersects with NY 35 in the hamlet of Whitehall Corners, site of a PepsiCo complex. In its northern extremes, NY 100 roughly parallels the Croton Reservoir on the north side before meeting up with US 202 in the hamlet of Somers, where it ends opposite the Elephant Hotel.

History

Early roads
The southernmost section of NY 100, known as "Central Avenue", appeared in maps by 1888. It was constructed as a plank road in 1874 connecting Macombs Dam Bridge (then known as Central Bridge) to Westchester County. The road continues south into the Bronx as Jerome Avenue, which was originally also called Central Avenue.

The middle section of NY 100 uses the southernmost segment of the Briarcliff-Peekskill Parkway, which is a continuation of the Saw Mill River Road, between Hawthorne and Briarcliff Manor, sharing it with NY 9A. The Saw Mill River Road splits from the parkway along with NY-100, and NY-100 uses the Saw Mill River Road until it splits from NY-100 in the Town of Yorktown to follow NY-118. The Saw Mill River Road is an early colonial road connecting many different hamlets and villages in Westchester County. It follows along the path of various rivers and brooks, the most notable of which being the road's namesake, the Saw Mill River, as it winds its way to the north of the county. The road is now used as parts of several state routes, including NY 9A, NY 100, and NY 118. The segment used by NY-100 mostly follows the Pocantico River.

The northernmost section of NY 100 runs along a part of the "Croton Turnpike", an early private toll road that was chartered in 1807. The Croton Turnpike connects the village of Ossining (then called Sing Sing) to the hamlet of Somers via Kitchawan. The road was made free in 1849. The Saw Mill River Road was rerouted to overlap the Croton Turnpike as it navigates around and across the Croton Reservoir, which was constructed between 1837 and 1842.

In 1908, the New York State Legislature created Route 2, an unsigned legislative route extending from the New York City line at Yonkers to the Columbia County village of Valatie. Route 2 followed Central Avenue (now NY 100) north through Yonkers to Hartsdale, where it veered west to bypass White Plains on modern NY 100A, NY 100B, and NY 119. It rejoined what is now NY 100 at the junction of Tarrytown Road (NY 119) and Hillside Avenue and followed it north along Hillside Avenue and Grasslands Road to the modern junction of NY 100, NY 100A, and NY 100C, at which point Route 2 continued west toward the Hudson River on current NY 100C.

Designation
NY 100 was first designated in the 1930 renumbering of state highways in New York, when many of the state roads in Westchester County were first publicly posted with route numbers. Originally, it went north from the Croton Reservoir to US 6 (now NY 6N) in Mahopac Falls on what is now NY 118, Baldwin Place Road, and Myrtle Avenue. Also assigned at this time was NY 118, which began adjacent to the Croton Reservoir at NY 100 and proceeded northeast along the Croton Turnpike to NY 22 in Croton Falls via modern NY 100 and US 202. The alignments of NY 100 and NY 118 north of the Croton Reservoir were swapped , placing NY 118 on the more westerly alignment and NY 100 on the Croton Turnpike between the reservoir and Croton Falls.

In December 1934, at the insistence of the Automobile Club of New York, several numbered routes were extended and signed within New York City, with NY 100 being one of these routes. NY 100 was extended south from the Yonkers line in the Bronx along Jerome Avenue to the Grand Concourse. NY 100 crossed into Manhattan via East 149th Street and the 145th Street Bridge. In Manhattan, NY 100 continued south along Lenox Avenue, 110th Street, Fifth Avenue, 96th Street, and Park Avenue, ending at Houston Street (NY 1A). South of Fordham Road, NY 100 was overlapped with NY 22 all the way to Houston Street. The NY 100 designation was removed from New York City following the opening of the Major Deegan Expressway in 1956.

In 1934, US 202 was designated and overlapped with NY 118 (later NY 100) from Somers to Croton Falls. The overlap between NY 100 and US 202 lasted as late as 1990. NY 100 was cut back to end at US 202 in Somers by 2004. The south end of NY 100 had been at the New York City line since 1956; however, as of 2007, NYSDOT recognizes the Cross County Parkway underpass as the official southern terminus of NY 100.

Expressway plans
In April 1956, the Westchester County Planning Commission recommended that a new expressway should be built along the current NY 100 north of White Plains. The road was to be an extension of the Central Corridor Expressway, which was proposed as NY 125. This  extension was stretch to Putnam County. The area was a high-priority corridor, stretching from the Cross-Westchester Expressway (I-287) to the proposed Northern Westchester Expressway (NY 35). North of NY 35, the area was a medium-priority corridor, ending at US 6 in Mahopac. This plan never materialized and Interstate 684 along the NY 22 corridor was built instead.

Suffixed routes
NY 100A is a bypass route of NY 100 that lets motorists avoid the frequently congested stretch of NY-100 in White Plains. NY 100A connects to Interstate 287 and goes near the NY 100B entrance to the Sprain Brook Parkway. It was assigned as part of the 1930 renumbering of state highways in New York.
NY 100B is a spur off NY 119. It connects to the Sprain Brook Parkway. The route was assigned in the late 1930s.
NY 100C is a spur off NY 100 in Eastview. It connects to the Saw Mill Parkway at its western terminus and the Sprain Brook Parkway near its intersection with NY 100 and NY 100A. It was assigned in the late 1930s.

Major intersections

See also

List of county routes in Westchester County, New York

References

External links

100
Transportation in Westchester County, New York
Transportation in Yonkers, New York